General elections were held in San Marino on 5 September 1943. After the former ruling party, the Sammarinese Fascist Party had been dissolved on 28 July, the "Lista Unica" was formed by a coalition of political leaders and non-partisans. It won all 60 seats.

However, with the formation of the Italian Social Republic by the Nazis, the Sammarinese Fascist Party was recreated, and the threatened newly elected Council appointed a fascist Congress of State with full powers, self suspending its own activity.

After the battle of San Marino in September 1944, the British Army occupied the republic until 31 December 1944, imposing the final disbandment of all fascist activities. A fresh election was consequently called.

Electoral system
Voters had to be citizens of San Marino, male and at least 24 years old.

Results

References

San Marino
General elections in San Marino
General
San Marino
Single-candidate elections